Pictures from Italy is a travelogue by Charles Dickens, written in 1846. The book reveals the concerns of its author as he presents, according to Kate Flint, the country "like a chaotic magic-lantern show, fascinated both by the spectacle it offers, and by himself as spectator".

References

External links
Pictures from Italy at Internet Archive.
 
Pictures from Italy at dickens-literature.com
 

1846 books
Books about Italy
Books about Rome
Books by Charles Dickens
British travel books
English non-fiction books